In the Company of a Poet is a 2012 book by the author and television documentary producer Nasreen Munni Kabir, containing her interview with Gulzar (an Indian filmmaker, lyricist, and poet). It details his early life, including his birth in 1934 in Dina, British India (now Pakistan), and his Sikh family background, his film and poetic career, and his marriage to the actress Rakhee in 1973, with whom he has a daughter, Meghna. In the Company of a Poet was published by Rupa Publications on 12 November 2012 and received mixed reviews from critics. Firstpost included the book in its listing of Top 10 in Indian Non-fiction Books.

The book became the third written work on Gulzar, after his daughter's Because He is... (2004) and journalist Saibal Chatterjee's Echoes & Eloquences (2007). Kabir and Gulzar discussed mostly the latter's experiences as a lyricist, poet, and screenwriter, avoiding their conversations to be focused on topics the previous publications have done. In the Company of a Poet development was done by doing online conversations on the telecommunication application Skype between May and November 2011, which was followed by their face-to-face conversations at the end of the same year.

Synopsis 
In the Company of a Poet features extensive conversations between its author Nasreen Munni Kabir and the filmmaker, lyricist, and poet Gulzar, relating to his life and career. Gulzar was born in a Sikh family as Sampooran Singh Kalra on 18 August 1934 in Dina, British India (now Pakistan). His father, Makhan Singh Kalra, was a Sardar and had married thrice (having a son and two daughters from a first marriage with Raaj) before his marriage to who later became Gulzar's mother, Sujaan Kaur. Gulzar said to Kabir that he is Kaur's only child as his mother died several months after giving birth. The book later extensively chronicles his Bollywood cinematic—mostly that of lyricist—and Urdu-language poetic career. He particularly speaks about his poetries, how he wrote his first poetry when he was at age ten, and later started a career as a poet. In 1973, Gulzar married to actress Raakhee, with whom he has a daughter named Meghna (who would become a filmmaker as well).

Development and writing 

In 1986, during the production of Movie Mahal (a 49-part television documentary on Bollywood aired on Channel 4), Kabir asked for journalist Khalid Mohamed's help to invite people with "significant" contributions to Bollywood. One of the interviewees was Gulzar, with whom she discussed the history of Bollywood's lyricists. After he agreeing the offers, Mohamed and Kabir arrived at his one-story bungalow on Pali Hill, Mumbai, to start shooting. Their second meeting was four years later while she was producing for another documentary for the same channel, on playback singer Lata Mangeshkar. Kabir recounted that Gulzar came up with insightful information about the singer—the same thing he did when was interviewed about the topics from their previous meetings. For later years, they would meet at several film festivals and private screenings only.

Kabir wrote in In the Company of a Poet foreword that she got the idea of the book "[preposterously] as this might sound" after having a dream in 2010, in which she was talking with Gulzar's contemporaries Sahir Ludhianvi and Shailendra; the lyricists told her to write a book in collaboration with Gulzar on their work. It consequently motivated her to do a call with Gulzar from London "no matter how overly dramatic the whole might seem to him", using his telephone number she got when they met coincidentally in the city. His manager, whom she referred to as Mr. Kutty, answered the call and asked her to wait for a while. Gulzar came on the line a few minutes later, telling Kabir to phone him once more after she arrives in India. In late 2010, she had returned to the country and subsequently got the approval from him.

Using the telecommunication application Skype, the conversations happened from May to November 2011 with over twenty-five sessions (each lasting around one or two hours) in English, Hindi, and Urdu. Two other books has been written on him—his daughter Meghna's Because He is... (2004) and Saibal Chatterjee's Echoes & Eloquences (2007). They avoid talking topics the previous publications have already done. Kabir, who had returned to London by the end of 2010 following Gulzar's consents on the idea of the book, chose to focus mostly on his work mostly as a lyricist, poet, and screenwriter. She added, "I also believed that even if we were to revisit events that were already known, [Gulzar] would shed new light on them from the perspective of who he is today." At the end of the following year, she went back to Mumbai and continue the conversations at Gulzar's office.

Critical reception 
In the Company of a Poet received mixed reviews from book critics. Bollywood Hungama gave the book a rating of two-and-a-half stars, concluding in its review, "If you haven't read any of the books centered on Gulzar yet, this one—though not the best of the lot—could still be your pick!" Although feeling ambivalent of the book, the critic said that it is suitable for those who wants to have insights of the Bollywood in the past decades from Gulzar's point-of-view. Lopamudra Ghatak of News18 praised Kabir for encouraging Gulzar to tell his personal life detailly and described the book as "a conversation with Kabir interrupting, interjecting and engaging her subject just enough, at the right moments". The Hindustan Times journalist Deepa Gahlot believed that it gives "a glimpse of where he comes from and the influences that shaped his extraordinary imagination and felicity with words".

Suresh Kohli of The Tribune criticised the book for "[lacking] a pattern, therefore the relative inconsistency", explaining that Kabir "flips from films to individuals without a pause, from people to poetry with the finesse of a trapeze artiste". For instance, they were talking about his poem dedicated to Meghna when she was 18, but Kabir suddenly change the topics to her birth. The New Indian Express complimented the book as interesting and filled with much new information of its subject. Writing for The Kashmir Walla, Atul K. Thakur stated, "Nasreen Munni Kabir, who is known for her authentic knowledge on cinema has made another remarkable mark by infusing biographical element in a long interview with a timeless phenomenon-Gulzar." Deccan Herald saw that Gulzar talks about his life in a humorous way.

Ziya Us Salam found the book to be a "breezy reading". In The Indian Express, Suanshu Khurana felt that In the Company of a Poet has flawed narrative shifts and many questions from Kabir have little connection with her next questions. Khurana took an example when Gulzar was telling her the screenwriting of Mughal-e-Azam (1960) and its director K. Asif, but Kabir next asked about the author-cum-screenwriter Nabendu Ghosh—the critic opined these flaws could make the book's readers confused. Asif Noorani of Dawn commended Kabir's ability to "draw Gulzar into a lively conversation, enabling us to hear about many people, their fads and foibles", Jitesh Pillai, the editor of Filmfare, praised her for making such an "engaging book" with "delightful insights", and Ramya Sarma of The Hindu shared similar thoughts, appreciating it for its informativeness.

The book was included in Firstpost end-year listing of Top 10 in Indian Non-fiction Books.

Publication history

References

Sources

External links 
 

2012 non-fiction books
Biographies about actors
Indian biographies
Indian non-fiction books
Rupa Publications books
Gulzar